Liman is the name of several inhabited localities in Russia.

Urban localities
Liman, Astrakhan Oblast, a work settlement in Limansky District, Astrakhan Oblast

Rural localities
Liman, Kursk Oblast, a village in Donskoy Selsoviet of Zolotukhinsky District of Kursk Oblast
Liman, Rostov Oblast, a khutor in Degtevskoye Rural Settlement of Millerovsky District of Rostov Oblast
Liman, Stavropol Krai, a selo in Limansky Selsoviet of Ipatovsky District of Stavropol Krai
Liman, Voronezh Oblast, a khutor in Fisenkovskoye Rural Settlement of Kantemirovsky District of Voronezh Oblast